Kepler-296f (also known by its Kepler Object of Interest designation KOI-1422.04) is a confirmed super-Earth exoplanet orbiting within the habitable zone of Kepler-296. The planet was discovered by NASA's Kepler spacecraft using the transit method, in which the dimming effect that a planet causes as it crosses in front of its star is measured. NASA announced the discovery of the exoplanet on 26 February 2014.

Confirmed exoplanet
Kepler 296f is a super-Earth with a radius 1.79 times that of Earth. The planet orbits Kepler-296 once every 63.3 days.

Habitability

The planet is located within the habitable zone of Kepler-296, a region where liquid water could exist on the surface of the planet.

See also 
 Habitability of red dwarf systems
 List of potentially habitable exoplanets

References

External links 
 NASA – Kepler Mission.
 NASA – Kepler Discoveries – Summary Table.
 NASA – Kepler-296f at The NASA Exoplanet Archive.
 NASA – Kepler-296f at The Exoplanet Data Explorer.
 NASA – Kepler-296f at The Extrasolar Planets Encyclopaedia.
 Habitable Exolanets Catalog at UPR-Arecibo.

 

Exoplanets discovered in 2014
296f
Exoplanets in the habitable zone
Super-Earths in the habitable zone
Transiting exoplanets
Kepler-296